Leo Young may refer to:

 Gus Young (footballer) (Leo Young, 1915–1941), Australian rules footballer 
 Leo Young (boxer) (born 1969), Australian boxer
 Leo C. Young (1891–1981), American radio engineer
 Emilio “Leo” Young (born 2005), American distance runner